Indian Statue may refer to:

 Black Hawk Statue
 Cigar store Indian